A prolonged period of intense tornado activity affected the Great Plains, Great Lakes, and Ohio Valley during May 15–20, 2017. This outbreak sequence was the most prolific tornado event of 2017 in terms of number of tornadoes. Overall, the outbreak sequence resulted in two deaths and several injuries.

Outbreak summary
On May 15, a severe weather outbreak struck areas from Northern Illinois to Texas. One EF0 tornado was reported in Iowa along with minor tree damage associated with the tornado. Numerous reports of strong winds and large hail along with some significant hail and wind was reported on May 15. On May 16, a widespread severe weather event impacted a line from Wisconsin to Texas according to storm reports. Many tornadoes, including some long tracked tornadoes, were reported in Texas, Oklahoma, and Kansas. Extensive damage occurred in a mobile home park near Chetek, where the fatality occurred, and EF3 strength damage occurred to a poorly-built home near Conrath, which was leveled. A large, high-end EF2 tornado also struck the southern fringes of Elk City, Oklahoma, killing one person and causing major damage. An EF3 tornado also damaged houses in Pawnee Rock, Kansas, and completely destroyed farm homes near Great Bend, injuring one person. On May 17, individual storm cells began to pop up along a line from Minnesota to Nebraska. The individual storm cells generated a few tornadoes in Iowa, Nebraska, and Minnesota before converging into a squall line. An EF2 tornado embedded in the squall line ripped the roof off of a house and injured one person near Galva, Illinois.

On May 18, a high risk of severe thunderstorms was issued for south-central Kansas and northwestern Oklahoma. The Storm Prediction Center stated that several intense and long-tracked tornadoes, along with hurricane-force winds and hail up to 4 inches in diameter were likely in the high risk area. Also, a 30% risk of tornadoes including significant tornados was issued in the high risk area. In the early afternoon, a line of intense supercells with baseball size hail fired along the dry line near the Texas and Oklahoma panhandle border. A few of these supercells went on to produce multiple scattered, short-lived tornadoes across three different states. Most were weak, though an EF2 tornado crumpled several metal power line truss towers near Haynesville, Texas. Later in the afternoon when the most intense severe weather was forecast to occur, a stationary front set up in northern Kansas lowering temperatures in most of the moderate and high risk areas. This led to insufficient instability and limited the severe weather in southern central Kansas and West central Oklahoma to smaller hail and winds. However, this also created a large plume of heavy precipitation that caused some flash flooding. In addition, the supercell thunderstorms that formed during this event initiated in the early afternoon, well before the best kinematics for tornado development had arrived. Later in the evening, the tornado threat was limited to central Texas and eastern Oklahoma. A large, slow moving high precipitation supercell with softball sized hail set up near Cross Plains, Texas. This storm was tornado warned for over an hour and produced many funnel clouds along with a couple of weak tornadoes. A squall line progressed through eastern Oklahoma and Kansas overnight, producing many embedded tornadoes, two of which reached EF2 intensity. One of these EF2 tornadoes struck Muskogee, Oklahoma, causing severe damage to trees, apartment buildings, and industrial buildings. A separate EF1 tornado impacted the western part of Muskogee as well, causing damage to homes and businesses, and downing many trees. The squall line continued into Friday morning, eventually making its way to parts of Arkansas and Missouri, producing numerous additional weak tornadoes. Other storms in states further to the west also produced many EF0 and EF1 tornadoes. On May 20, the severe weather threat generally was limited. However, a few weak tornadoes were spawned in Indiana as plentiful helicity and the presence of a warm front aided the development of tornadoes. Overall, this outbreak sequence produced 134 tornadoes.

Confirmed tornadoes

May 15 event

May 16 event

May 17 event

May 18 event

May 19 event

May 20 event

Chetek – Conrath, Wisconsin

This rain-wrapped, multiple-vortex EF3 wedge tornado was the longest-tracked tornado in Wisconsin state history. It moved through rural areas in the northwestern part of the state, producing an 82.53-mile long path of damage through four counties. The tornado touched down in Polk County, several miles east of Clear Lake, very close to the Polk/Barron County line. The first point of damage occurred at a farmstead, where structures sustained EF0 damage and sheet metal was tossed into a field. The tornado then quickly crossed into Barron County. Further to the northeast, some trees were downed and another farm sustained EF0 damage, with barrels being rolled out into a field and a pole barn having its doors blown in. Continuing along an east-northeasterly path through rural areas of the county, the tornado reached EF1 intensity, snapping and uprooting many trees and striking several farms. Sheds and outbuildings were damaged or destroyed, with sheet metal thrown and wrapped around trees and pieces of lumber speared into the ground. Two silos were sheared off as well. The tornado then widened and began moving in a more due-easterly direction, reaching EF2 strength as it crossed the Red Cedar River. Outbuildings were completely destroyed, a house had its roof torn off, many trees were snapped, and several other homes and a warehouse building sustained heavy roof damage in this area. Several mobile homes were destroyed further to the east before the tornado crossed U.S. Route 53 northeast of Chetek. High-end EF2 damage occurred in this area as the Prairie Lakes Estates mobile home park sustained devastating damage. Numerous mobile homes were completely destroyed at this location, with large amounts of debris scattered throughout a nearby wooded area. Structural debris, furniture, clothing, and appliances were strewn throughout the park, and several vehicles were damaged or destroyed. Many trees were snapped and denuded in this area as well. One person at Prairie Lakes was killed and several others were injured, some critically. The tornado then struck a nearby turkey farm, where several large turkey barns were completely flattened with the debris strewn downwind, killing at least 25,000 turkeys. Several wooden power poles were snapped in this area as well. The tornado maintained high-end EF2 strength as it crossed Prairie Lake, where a wide swath of trees was flattened and several lakeside cottages sustained total roof loss and collapse of exterior walls. Weakening to EF1 strength and resuming a more northeasterly path, the tornado then crossed Mud Lake, snapping many more trees and causing mostly minor damage to numerous RVs, mobile homes, and lakeside homes. Past Mud Lake, several rural properties and farmsteads were struck at EF1 intensity, with outbuildings and garages destroyed. In Barron County alone, 40 homes were destroyed, 45 were heavily damaged, and 75 others sustained minor damage. Four businesses were destroyed, and two others were damaged.

Maintaining EF1 strength, the tornado continued into Rusk County and destroyed or damaged numerous outbuildings and downed many trees. An isolated pocket of EF2 damage occurred several miles east of the Rusk County line, as a frame home had its roof ripped off and a nearby detached garage was completely destroyed. Debris was blown into a nearby wooded area, along with a large metal propane tank. EF1 damage continued through rural areas of the county, with countless trees snapped or uprooted, many outbuildings damaged or destroyed, and homes sustaining roof damage. A silo had its metal top blown off, and cabins sustained damage at Amacoy Lake. Past Amacoy Lake, many additional trees were downed and more outbuildings were damaged or destroyed. As the tornado approached the small village of Conrath, it re-strengthened back to EF2 intensity. A large barn was completely destroyed, a detached garage was swept away, and a manufactured home was damaged in this area. As the tornado passed just north of Conrath, it reached its maximum intensity. A poorly-anchored home was completely leveled at EF3 intensity in this area, with only a pile of rubble left behind. Nearby trees were snapped and denuded as well. Past Conrath, the tornado rapidly weakened back to EF1 strength as it continued to the east, damaging or destroying outbuildings and downing numerous trees. In Rusk County, one home was destroyed, three were severely damaged, and 21 sustained minor damage. Damage along the remainder of the path and into Price County consisted entirely of EF0 level tree damage. The tornado dissipated to the west-southwest of Ogema. The tornado reached a maximum width of 1,320 yards and killed one person. 25 others were injured.

See also
1996 Oakfield tornado outbreak

Notes

References

2017 natural disasters in the United States
May 2017 events
Tornadoes of 2017